Chen Yuan may refer to:
 Chen Yuan (prince) (574–?), Chen dynasty prince
 Chen Yuan (historian) (1880–1971), Chinese historian
 Chen Yuan (born 1945), Chinese economist and politician
 Chen Yuan (water polo) (born 1989), Chinese water polo player